Sikhulile Moyo is a Zimbabwean virologist working as the laboratory director of the Botswana–Harvard AIDS Institute Partnership and a research associate at the Harvard T.H. Chan School of Public Health. In November 2021, Moyo and his laboratory were the first to identify the SARS-CoV-2 Omicron variant. In 2022, Moyo was listed in the Time 100 list.

Early life and education 
Moyo was born in Zimbabwe. He completed an undergraduate degree at the University of Zimbabwe in 1996. He completed a master's degree in applied microbiology at the University of Botswana in 2000. In 2006, Moyo completed a M.P.H. at the University of Limpopo (MEDUNSA-campus). His thesis was titled Modelling the HIV / AIDS in Botswana: the representativeness of the ANC based estimates of HIV prevalence in Botswana and implications for monitoring the epidemic. Moyo completed a Ph.D. in medical virology at Stellenbosch University in 2016. Tulio de Oliveira was one of his professors. His dissertation was titled Evolutionary trends and dynamics of HIV-1C in Botswana.

Career 
Moyo joined the Botswana–Harvard AIDS Institute Partnership in 2003 as a lab assistant. He later became the laboratory coordinator, deputy manager, and then lab manager in 2016. As of November 2021, Moyo is the laboratory director. He is also a research associate in immunology and infectious diseases at the Harvard T.H. Chan School of Public Health. 

In November 2021, Moyo and his laboratory were the first to identify the SARS-CoV-2 Omicron variant. Upon discovery, they alerted the Botswanan Ministry of Health on November 22, 2021. In 2022, Moyo was listed in the Time 100 list.

Personal life 
Moyo is married and has two sons and a daughter. He is a gospel singer and composer.

References 

Living people
Year of birth missing (living people)
Place of birth missing (living people)
Zimbabwean biologists
Virologists
21st-century biologists
University of Zimbabwe alumni
University of Botswana alumni
Sefako Makgatho Health Sciences University alumni
Stellenbosch University alumni
Harvard School of Public Health faculty
HIV/AIDS researchers